Arctoptychites is a genus of extinct cephalopods belonging to the ceratitid family Ptychitidae, and related to such genera as Ptychites and Aristoptychites; all from the Triassic.

The Ptychitidae, to which Arctoptychites belongs, is a family of ceratitid ammonites (sensu lato) with ammonitic sutures and variably subglobular to compressed, ribbed or smooth, generally evolute shells.

References 

Ptychitaceae
Ceratitida genera
Triassic ammonites
Fossils of Svalbard